Niklas Treutle (born 29 April 1991) is a German professional ice hockey goaltender currently playing for the Nürnberg Ice Tigers in the German top-flight DEL. In the 2015–16 season, he played within the Arizona Coyotes organization of the National Hockey League (NHL).

Playing career
Undrafted, Treutle formerly played in his native country in the Deutsche Eishockey Liga (DEL) with the Nürnberg Ice Tigers, Hamburg Freezers and EHC München.

After a career best 2014–15 season in the DEL with München, Treutle attracted the attention of the NHL and was signed to a one-year entry-level contract with the Arizona Coyotes on 30 July 2015. He made two NHL appearances for the Coyotes and mostly played for their AHL affiliate Springfield Falcons during his single year in North America.

Following the conclusion of the 2015–16 campaign, Treutle moved back to Europe and joined KooKoo of the Finnish top-flight Liiga on a try-out contract. He saw the ice in four Liiga contests at the beginning of the 2016–17 season, before returning to his native Germany in October 2016, where he signed with DEL outfit Krefeld Pinguine.

In April 2017, Treutle signed to return to his hometown team Nürnberg Ice Tigers.

International play
Treutle represented Germany at the 2018 IIHF World Championship in Denmark.

Career statistics

Regular season and playoffs

International

References

External links
 

1991 births
German ice hockey goaltenders
Living people
Arizona Coyotes players
ETC Crimmitschau players
Hamburg Freezers players
KooKoo players
Krefeld Pinguine players
EHC München players
Nürnberg Ice Tigers players
Sportspeople from Nuremberg
Ravensburg Towerstars players
SC Riessersee players
Springfield Falcons players
Thomas Sabo Ice Tigers players
Undrafted National Hockey League players
German expatriate sportspeople in Finland
German expatriate sportspeople in the United States